The women's 400 metres hurdles event at the 1997 European Athletics U23 Championships was held in Turku, Finland, on 11 and 12 July 1997.

Medalists

Results

Final
12 July

Heats
11 July
Qualified: first 3 in each heat and 2 best to the Final

Heat 1

Heat 2

Participation
According to an unofficial count, 11 athletes from 10 countries participated in the event.

 (1)
 (1)
 (2)
 (1)
 (1)
 (1)
 (1)
 (1)
 (1)
 (1)

References

400 metres hurdles
400 metres hurdles at the European Athletics U23 Championships